The term Aryan language appears in works published in the 19th century and 20th century to mean very old Indo-European languages:
The Vedic Sanskrit language
The Old Persian language
The Avestan language
The Bactrian language 
The term Proto-Aryan is an alternative name of the Proto-Indo-Iranian language
In works published in the late 19th century and early 20th century, this term, or the term Proto-Aryan, was sometimes used to describe the Proto-Indo-European language

See also
Aryan (disambiguation)